Andinobates claudiae is a species of frog in the family Dendrobatidae.

It is endemic to Panama. Its natural habitats are subtropical or tropical moist lowland forests. It is threatened by habitat loss.

References

claudiae
Amphibians of Panama
Amphibians described in 2000
Taxonomy articles created by Polbot